This article comprises an overview of the Denmark women's national football team records and statistics, from their first official match against Sweden in 1974 to the present day.

Most appearances

Players denoted in bold are still playing or available for selection. As of 15 November 2022, the 25 most capped players for Denmark are:

Goalscorers

Top goalscorers
Players still playing or available for selection are in bold. With 67 goals, Pernille Harder is currently the number one goalscorer in Danish football history. As of 15 November 2022, players with 10 goals or more for Denmark are:

Team captains
As of 11 November 2022, the ten players with the most caps as Danish team captains are:

References

Denmark women's national football team